Luis René Canaán Rojas is a medic, marine and politician from the Dominican Republic. He is Senator for the province of Hermanas Mirabal and was elected in 2006, and re-elected in 2010 and 2016; and has served in the Dominican Navy.

Canaán has a Doctorate of Medicine from the Santo Domingo Institute of Technology.

Super Tucano corruption scandal 
In August 2016, Senator Canaán was accused of taking 3 million dollars as a bribe from Brazilian entrepreneurs to influence in the bidding for purchase of military aircraft, favoring Embraer over its American competitors. The Dominican Congress passed in 2009 a 94 million-dollar deal for the purchase of 8 Embraer EMB 314 Super Tucano attack warplanes with a loan from the Brazilian bank BNDES.

It was known for years that a Leonelist senator was implicated in the corruption scheme, but it was in August 2016, when his name was finally revealed.

Beside Senator Canaán, two high-rank military officers, Air Vice-marshal Pedro Rafael Peña, who was defense minister during the presidency of Leonel Fernández, and Colonel Carlos Ramón Piccini, were formally accused and arrested. Senator Canaán, who enjoys parliamentary immunity, has not been indicted nor arrested.

Judicial authorities informed that the inquest is part of an investigation led by the United States and Brazil.

The United States Federal Reserve has been investigating Embraer since 2010 due to a possible violation of the Foreign Corrupt Practices Act.

In 2011, it was revealed that almost 17 million dollars were diverted illegally.

See also 
 Operation Car Wash

References 

Living people
1967 births
Dominican Republic people of Lebanese descent
Dominican Liberation Party politicians
Members of the Senate of the Dominican Republic
Political corruption
Santo Domingo Institute of Technology alumni
21st-century Dominican Republic politicians